Sergiño Gianni Dest (born November 3, 2000) is a professional soccer player who plays as a full-back for  club AC Milan, on loan from Barcelona. Born in the Netherlands to a Dutch mother and Surinamese-American father, he represents the United States national team.

Early life
Born in the Netherlands to a Surinamese-American father and a Dutch mother,  Dest played for the youth academy of Almere City until 2012, when he moved to the Ajax youth academy. Initially a forward, he progressed through the ranks of the club until making the switch to a full-back.

Club career

Ajax
Dest debuted for Jong Ajax on October 15, 2018, in a 2–1 loss against Jong PSV. Dest impressed over the course of the 2018–19 season, making 18 appearances in the Dutch Eerste Divisie and tallying one goal and two assists. He also scored one goal and provided one assist in seven appearances in the prestigious UEFA Youth League.

On July 27, 2019, Dest made his debut for the Ajax first team in an official game when he started the 2019 Johan Cruyff Shield match against rivals PSV Eindhoven. Ajax won the match 2–0 and claimed the trophy. On August 10, 2019, Dest debuted in the Eredivisie, replacing Noussair Mazraoui in the 54th minute of Ajax's 5–0 home win against FC Emmen. He also appeared as a substitute in qualifying matches for the UEFA Champions League against PAOK and APOEL. In September, Dest was officially promoted to the Ajax first-team squad. On September 17, 2019, he made his first start in the Champions League against Lille OSC, a match which Ajax won 3–0. Dest finished his first senior season with 35 appearances in which he scored two goals—both in a KNVB Cup fixture against Telstar.

Barcelona
On October 1, 2020, Dest transferred to Barcelona for an initial €21 million fee plus a further €5 million in variables. He signed a five-year contract with the club with a buyout clause set at €400 million. Dest made his debut for Barcelona on October 4, coming on as a 75th minute substitute for Jordi Alba in a 1–1 draw against Sevilla. With the appearance, Dest became the first American to appear for Barcelona in La Liga. On October 20, he became the first American to play for Barcelona in a UEFA Champions League match. Later that month, Dest set another milestone, becoming the first American to play in El Clásico; Barcelona fell to a 1–3 defeat to rivals Real Madrid but Dest's performance in the match was praised. On November 24, 2020, Dest scored his first goal for Barcelona in a 4–0 away win over Dynamo Kyiv in the Champions League group stage. In doing so, Dest became the first American to score a professional goal for the club. On March 21, 2021, he scored a brace in a 6–1 away win over Real Sociedad.

Loan to AC Milan
On September 1, 2022, Dest signed for Serie A club AC Milan on a one-year loan with option to buy for €20 million.

International career
Dest has dual nationality making him eligible to play for either the United States or the Netherlands and ultimately chose to play for the United States' senior national team. Dest has represented the United States at youth and full international level. He played five games in total for the United States under-17 team, including four appearances at the 2017 FIFA Under-17 World Cup. He represented the United States under-20 team at the 2019 FIFA Under-20 World Cup, where he played four matches. In total, he made 12 appearances and scored one goal for the under-20 team.

Dest made his senior debut for the United States on September 6, 2019, starting and playing 68 minutes in a 3–0 friendly loss against Mexico. Dest chose to commit his international future to the United States at the senior level on October 28, 2019. He was included in the United States' 26-man roster for the 2022 World Cup in Qatar.

During the 2022 FIFA World Cup, Dest provided the assist for Christian Pulisic's winning goal in a 1–0 victory over Iran, which sent the United States into the Round of 16. In that next game against Netherlands (his birth nation), he was culpable in leaving too much space for Daley Blind to score the second Dutch goal in a 3–1 defeat for the US.

Style of play
Dest combines many key qualities needed in a full-back, including strong attacking prowess, solid defensive play, and being excellent in possession. He has the ability to take players on and his pace is a virtue going forward and defending.

Career statistics

Club

International

Scores and results list United States' goal tally first, score column indicates score after each Dest goal.

Honors
Ajax
Johan Cruyff Shield: 2019

Barcelona
Copa del Rey: 2020–21

United States U20
 CONCACAF U-20 Championship: 2018

United States
CONCACAF Nations League: 2019–20

Individual
2018 CONCACAF U-20 Championship Best XI
U.S. Soccer Young Male Athlete of the Year: 2019
Ajax Talent of the Year (Marco van Basten Award): 2020
IFFHS Men's World Youth (U20) Team: 2020

References

External links

Profile at the FC Barcelona website

2000 births
Living people
Citizens of the United States through descent
American people of Dutch descent
American people of Surinamese descent
Sportspeople of Surinamese descent
Dutch people of American descent
Dutch sportspeople of Surinamese descent
Footballers from Almere
Association football fullbacks
American soccer players
Dutch footballers
Eredivisie players
Eerste Divisie players
Jong Ajax players
AFC Ajax players
La Liga players
FC Barcelona players
A.C. Milan players
American expatriate soccer players
American expatriate sportspeople in Spain
American expatriate sportspeople in Italy
Dutch expatriate footballers
Dutch expatriate sportspeople in Spain
Dutch expatriate sportspeople in Italy
Expatriate footballers in Spain
Expatriate footballers in Italy
United States men's youth international soccer players
United States men's under-20 international soccer players
United States men's international soccer players
2022 FIFA World Cup players